Racing White Daring de Molenbeek 47, also known as RWD Molenbeek and often referred to as RWDM, is a Belgian professional football club founded in 1951 as Standaard Wetteren.  In 2015, Wetteren folded and merged with another club, liberating the matricule which was sold to people wanting to revive the former RWDM with matricule 47 which folded in 2002. As such the new club was named RWDM47. The club has been on the rise ever since winning two consecutive promotions from the fifth tier to the fourth and fourth to third. In December 2021, the club announced that it had come under the ownership of American business executive John Textor, who also holds stakes in English side Crystal Palace, Brazilian side Botafogo and French side Lyon.

RWDM's academy is considered one of the best in Belgium, and many footballers have come from there, notably Adnan Januzaj and Michy Batshuayi to name a few Belgian internationals as well as a few internationals for other countries.

The club currently plays in the Belgian First Division B. It participated in the 2015–16 Belgian Cup, where it reached the fourth round.

Rivalries and fanbase 
RWDM's traditional rival is Union Saint-Gilloise, which goes back to the 19th century when RWDM were known as Daring Club. RWDM also have a rivalry with RSC Anderlecht, with just 3 kilometres separating the two clubs and the fixtures often taking over the mantle of the "Derby of Brussels" in the professional era due to Union's relative decline. RWDM also have rivalries with Eendracht Aalst, Lierse and RFC Liège.

RWDM drew support from across the Belgian capital due to its merger of 4 teams, as well as in the Periphery, where many Brusseleirs migrated to, in contrast to the more locally based Saint-Gilles support and the nationwide Anderlecht support. It had high attendances for a big part of its existence as RWDM, until financial troubles and the subsequent changeover with Johan Vermeesch in charge of the new club led to the name change to FC Brussels, and caused a split in the fanbase. During their years as FC Brussels, the Ultra group Brussels Power 05 emerged, while many of the "old school" casuals "Brussels Boys" boycotted. These days both supporter groups sit in the same Bloc A.

Players

First-team squad

Out on loan

Club staff

See also
 R.W.D. Molenbeek

References

External links

 Official website

 
Football clubs in Belgium
Association football clubs established in 1951
1951 establishments in Belgium
Molenbeek-Saint-Jean
Football clubs in Brussels